Refuge de l'Archeboc is a refuge in the Alps.

Mountain huts in the Alps
Mountain huts in France